is a Japanese manga artist. He began drawing manga at an early age, before being recognized for his talent by publishing company Shueisha while attending college. Togashi has authored several manga series in different genres during the past three decades. He is perhaps best known for writing and illustrating the YuYu Hakusho (1990–1994) and Hunter × Hunter (1998–present) series, both of which are some of the best-selling manga in history. Togashi is married to Naoko Takeuchi, the author of Sailor Moon.

Biography

Early life
Born in Shinjō, Yamagata to a family that owned a paper shop, Togashi began drawing manga casually in his first to second year of elementary school. In high school, Togashi joined the fine-arts club; he later enrolled at Yamagata University where he studied education in the hope of becoming a teacher. During college he submitted some of his manga work to Weekly Young Jump, published by Shueisha. In 1986, at age 20, he authored a manga titled  for which he received the Tezuka Award, the most prestigious award for new comic artists in Japan. Another manga by Togashi titled  was an honorable mention in Shueisha's first annual Hop Step Award Selection magazine, published in 1988. After having given up his goal of becoming a teacher, Togashi was contacted by an editor of Weekly Shōnen Jump during his senior year of college, who asked him to move to Tokyo.

Career
Togashi's earliest published works for Shueisha include , a collection of comedy manga short-stories. Weekly Shōnen Jump published some of the stories prior to a tankōbon release in 1989. Between 1989 and 1990, Togashi authored , a four-volume romance manga involving the relationship between a normal, human boy and a beautiful, devil girl.

In 1990 Togashi made a name for himself with his next series . Based on his interests in the occult and in horror films, the plot features the character Yusuke Urameshi, who is killed and brought back to life as an "Underworld Detective". The manga, which lasted 175 chapters over 19 tankōbon from 1990 to 1994, went on to sell over 50 million copies worldwide, earned Togashi a Shogakukan Manga Award in 1994, and received a hit anime adaptation.  In 1995, he created , a science fiction-comedy manga. Comprising three volumes, it was first published in Weekly Shōnen Jump in 1995 and ran until 1997. Level E was adapted into an anime television series in 2011.

Togashi's next major series , an action-adventure manga, began serialization in 1998. The story revolves around the protagonist Gon Freecss, a young boy in search of his father, who is a legendary, elite member of society called a "Hunter". This manga also performed very well commercially, with the first 20 volumes selling nearly 55 million copies in Japan as of August 2011. In 2008, Togashi tied with One Piece author Eiichiro Oda as the fifth favorite manga artist from a poll posted by the marketing research firm Oricon.

In 2017, Togashi wrote the two-chapter manga . It was illustrated by Hachi Mizuno and published in the September and November issues of Grand Jump Premium.

Personal life
Togashi is married to Naoko Takeuchi, the manga artist of Sailor Moon. The two were introduced at a party hosted by Kazushi Hagiwara in August 1997. The following year, Takeuchi assisted Togashi for a short time by adding screentone to his manga Hunter × Hunter. Togashi and Takeuchi were married on January 6, 1999. In attendance for the ceremony were several fellow manga artists and voice actors from both the Sailor Moon and Yu Yu Hakusho anime series. The couple have two children and have collaborated on a children's book titled , which Takeuchi wrote and Togashi illustrated.

Togashi enjoys board-game-style video games and bowling with his family. He also likes watching horror movies, and considers Don't Look Up and Dawn of the Dead his favorites. Togashi cites visual effects designer H. R. Giger as a major influence. Togashi suffered from an immense amount of stress while working on YuYu Hakusho, which caused him inconsistent sleep patterns and chest pain. On March 29, 2011, Togashi and his fellow manga artists posted messages on the official Shōnen Jump website in support of the victims of the 2011 Tōhoku earthquake and tsunami. He has a younger brother named Hideaki Togashi, who is also a manga artist. The Togashi Paper Store run by his mother is still open in Shinjō, Yamagata.

On May 24, 2022, Togashi created a Twitter account that was later verified by Shueisha. He gained over a million followers in one day, and 2 million in 72 hours. He is the most-followed manga artist on the platform, with over three million followers.

Style
Manga critic Jason Thompson stated that "Togashi is no ordinary mangaka; he does things his own way", furthering that his first one-shots were a mix of school comedy and "splatter-film horror references". At age 24, Togashi created a hit with the supernatural fighting comedy YuYu Hakusho, one of the "obvious imitators" of the Dragon Ball formula of "start out as a comedy and then, once the readers like the characters, have them kick the crap out of each other". Then, rather than continue the series for as long as possible to maximize his profit, Togashi ended the series abruptly. He then created the "0% fighting and 100% humor" science-fiction horror manga Level E.

Togashi's style of artwork began with screentone but gradually developed into minimalism. Both Rika Takahashi of EX.org and Claude J. Pelletier of Protoculture Addicts found the art style in Hunter × Hunter much simpler than YuYu Hakusho and Level E. Thompson noted that artwork during Hunter × Hunters magazine run is often "sketchy" and missing backgrounds, but Togashi goes back and fixes it for its collected tankōbon release. He also wrote that Togashi has a love of gore and noted that some panels in Hunter × Hunter are apparently censored for gore, being covered with screentone.

Since 2006, Togashi has taken numerous lengthy hiatuses while serializing Hunter × Hunter. Some were due to illness and lower back pain, while reasons for others were never disclosed. In 2012, Thompson speculated that Togashi's slow output was "because he's a perfectionist who enjoys his work and wants to do things himself", noting that his assistants could potentially be called upon further. In his 2017 book Sensei Hakusho, which recounts his work as Togashi's assistant from 1990 to 1997, Kunio Ajino stated that Togashi was unusually generous to his staff. In July 2022, Togashi revealed that he was unable to sit in a chair for two years due to his back and hip problems, but was able to resume drawing by doing so while lying down.

Manga artists Nobuhiro Watsuki and Pink Hanamori have cited Togashi and YuYu Hakusho as an influence. He is one of the favorite artists of Naruto author Masashi Kishimoto. Jujutsu Kaisen author Gege Akutami is very influenced by Togashi and inspired by YuYu Hakusho and Hunter × Hunter.

Works

Manga
 Sensēha Toshishita!! (1986, later featured in Ten de Shōwaru Cupid Volume 4)
 Jura no Miduki (1987, featured in Hop Step Award Selection Volume 1 and later in Ten de Shōwaru Cupid Volume 4)
 Ōkami Nante Kowakunai!! (1989, tankōbon published by Shueisha)
 Buttobi Straight (1987)
 Tonda Birthday Present (1987, published in Weekly Shōnen Jump)
 Occult Tanteidan (1988–1989, two parts published in Weekly Shōnen Jump)
 Horror Angel (1988, published in Weekly Shōnen Jump)
 Ōkami Nante Kowakunai!! (1989, published in Weekly Shōnen Jump)
 Ten de Shōwaru Cupid (1989–1990, serialized in Weekly Shōnen Jump)
 YuYu Hakusho (1990–1994, serialized in Weekly Shōnen Jump)

 Level E (1995–1997, serialized in Weekly Shōnen Jump)
 Hunter × Hunter (1998–present), serialized in Weekly Shōnen Jump)
 Akuten Wars (2017, published in Grand Jump Premium, story only, illustrated by Hachi Mizuno)

Other
 Yoshirin de Pon! (1994, YuYu Hakusho dōjinshi distributed at 1994 summer Comic Market)
 Biohazard 3: The Last Escape Official Guidebook (1999, published by ASCII)
 Official Hunter × Hunter Guide (2004, published by Shueisha)
 YuYu Hakusho Who's Who Underworld Character Book (2005, published by Shueisha)
 YuYu Hakusho Illustrations (2005, published by Shueisha)
 Oobo— Nu— To Chiibo— Nu— (2005, published by Kodansha)
 Hetappi Manga Kenkyūjo R (2011, published by Shueisha)

References

External links 
 
 Yoshihiro Togashi Exhibition -Puzzle- website 
 

 
1966 births
Living people
Manga artists from Yamagata Prefecture